Overbrook is a neighborhood northwest of West Philadelphia, Philadelphia, in the U.S. state of Pennsylvania. The area's housing ranges from large, old homes to rowhouses to 3- and 4-story apartment buildings.

Physical setting
The name Overbrook is commonly used to refer both to a specific neighborhood and a larger area of northwestern West Philadelphia that includes four Philadelphia City Planning Commission neighborhoods: Overbrook, Overbrook Farms, Morris Park and Overbrook Park. These four neighborhoods are united by the close proximity of Overbrook High School, the Overbrook School for the Blind, the Overbrook SEPTA Station, and Overbrook Avenue. Depending on the definition of Overbrook Farms, The Overbrook School for the Blind either lies partially in Morris Park and partially in Overbrook Farms or entirely in Morris Park.

According to the Philadelphia City Planning Commission, the main boundaries for the Overbrook neighborhood are North 63rd Street to the west, Lansdowne Avenue to the south, and the SEPTA regional rail tracks to the northeast. A very small portion of Woodbine Avenue between North 63rd Street and the SEPTA regional rail tracks bounds Overbrook to the north while a very small portion of North 52nd Street between Lansdowne Avenue and the SEPTA regional rail tracks bounds Overbrook to the south.

According to the Commission, the northern boundary of Overbrook Farms is City Avenue (US 1). The western boundary is North 66th Street between City Avenue and Woodcrest Avenue and Morris Park between Woodcrest Avenue and Malvern Avenue. The southern border is Malvern Avenue to Wynnewood Road, a small portion of Wynnewood Road, and Woodbine Avenue from Wynnewood Road to North 58th Street. The eastern boundary is North 58th Street between Woodbine Avenue and Overbrook Avenue, a small portion of Overbrook Avenue, and then Cardinal Avenue between Overbrook Avenue and City Avenue. Overbrook Farms borders Saint Joseph's University on its northeast corner. Although the Philadelphia City Planning Commission considers Malvern Avenue to form part of the southern border, the Overbrook Farms Club says, "At present, there are 413 buildings in Overbrook Farms, which is bounded by 58th and 66th Streets and Woodbine and City Avenues, and bisected by Lancaster Avenue".

West of the Overbrook neighborhood is Morris Park, which derives its name from the eponymous park on the neighborhood’s western edge. The eastern boundary of the neighborhood is North 63rd Street. On the north, the boundary is Woodbine Avenue between North 63rd Street and Wynnewood Road, Wynnewood Road between Woodbine Avenue and Malvern Avenue, and Malvern Avenue between Wynnewood Road and North 68th Street. On the west, the boundary is North 68th Street and Morris Park between Malvern Avenue and Haverford Avenue, Cobbs Creek Park between Haverford Avenue and North 67th Street, and North 67th Street between Callowhill Street and North Gross Street. The southern border is Arch Street at North Gross Street, bordering Cobbs Creek Park at Upper Darby's border.

Overbrook Park's boundaries are City Avenue to the north and Morris Park on the west, south, and east. Haverford Avenue connects Overbrook Park to the Morris Park neighborhood while City Avenue connects Overbrook Park to Overbrook Farms. Greater Overbrook is in the Fourth Councilmanic District of Philadelphia, represented by Councilman Curtis Jones, Jr., elected on October 10, 2006 to a first term. The 19th Police District of the Philadelphia Police Department protects Overbrook.

Overbrook developed in various stages between 1900 and 1960. The dominant housing type is the row house, present in a wide variety of styles. Built in the early 20th century when trolley lines were allowing middle-class Philadelphians to move out from more crowded row house communities, Overbrook was a community of choice when it was built. Outside of Overbrook Farms, most of the houses in the Overbrook area date from between 1915 and 1930, when the Great Depression halted new construction nationally and locally. In addition to rowhouses, one can find a sizeable number of twin (semi-detached) houses. Prime examples of typical Overbrook twin houses are along Wynnewood Road from Haverford Avenue to Malvern Avenue, North 64th Street between Lansdowne and Lebanon Avenues, or Nassau Road between North 61st and 63rd Streets. There are very few detached single-family homes in Overbrook. Single homes typically pre-date the construction of most of Overbrook’s housing or came into existence on select lots after the construction of most of the rowhouses and twin houses. For example, one will see a few single-family homes on Wynnewood Road near Columbia Avenue. A large stone home remains this intersection. This home once sat on acres of land that the owner(s) sold off to developers who then constructed twin houses and rowhouses. The vast majority of the single-family, detached homes in the Overbrook area are in the Overbrook Farms neighborhood.

Landmarks

Overbrook, while overwhelmingly residential in character, does have several notable landmark buildings and institutions
African Episcopal Church of St. Thomas -  6361 Lancaster Avenue
Our Lady of Lourdes Catholic School and Church – 63rd and Lancaster, historic grade school where actor Will Smith attended
 Overbrook Elementary School – 2032 N. 62nd St., listed on the National Register of Historic Places
 Overbrook High School – 59th and Lancaster, listed on the National Register of Historic Places
 Cobbs Creek Park – forms southern border of Overbrook section, undergoing restoration in many places
 Harambee Charter School – 66th and Harlan Streets, Afro-Centric curriculum, opened on site of old Overbrook Italian Club
 Bocce Courts – Cobbs Creek Park at Vine Street, bocce still played daily by former and current (mostly) elderly residents
 Overbrook School for the Blind – Malvern Avenue near 64th, landmark campus sporting Spanish Revival architecture
 Lewis C. Cassidy School/Academics Plus School, 6523 Lansdowne Avenue, Philadelphia, Pennsylvania 19151, listed on the National Register of Historic Places

Education

Overbrook High School is located in Overbrook.

The Free Library of Philadelphia Haddington Branch serves Overbrook-Morris Park.

Saint Joseph's University is located nearby.

Overbrook School for the Blind

Overbrook in media
Entertainer Will Smith, who attended Overbrook High School, named his production company, Overbrook Entertainment, after the neighborhood.

References

External links

 Overbrook Farms Club website
 InfoResources West Philadelphia Neighborhood - Overbrook
 Focus on changes in the Overbrook area watershed and natural landscape - photos & maps – photos & maps
 Photo link - 63rd St/Malvern Ave loop
 Photo link - Overbrook School for the Blind
 Photo link - looking south over Overbrook Farms
 Overbrook School for the Blind website

 
Neighborhoods in Philadelphia
Philadelphia Main Line